Walter Buckley may refer to:

 Buck Buckley (Walter White Buckley III), co-founder of venture capital firm Internet Capital Group
 Walter Buckley (footballer), an English footballer
 Walter F. Buckley, an American sociologist

See also 
 William Buckley (disambiguation)